Parapetrobius azoricus is a species of jumping bristletails, in the family Machilidae, that inhabits the Azores. It is the only species in Parapetrobius.

The species were first identified by Portuguese entomologist, Luis Fernando Marques Mendes in 1980, on the Formigas Islets, a group of small rocky outcrops in the eastern group of the Azores archipelago. The species were also subsequently found in the Lajes coastal area on Pico Island.

References

Archaeognatha
Endemic arthropods of the Azores
Insects described in 1980